Arto Kai Antturi (born Helsinki, 10 June 1961) is a Finnish Lutheran priest. He has previously been the vicar for the parish of Pitäjänmäki.

Arto Antturi’s father was the Pentecostal minister Kai Antturi. Arto Antturi graduated with a master’s degree in theology from the University of Helsinki in 1989. For most of the 1990s, he worked as a research and teaching assistant in the Department of Exegesis at the same university. He received a scholarship from the Alfred Kordelin Foundation in 1992. In 1997, he received a grant from the Finnish Cultural Foundation. He has studied at Vanderbilt University in Nashville, USA.

Later, Antturi lived with his family in Dublin for two years, serving as a priest for the Finnish Seamen’s Mission. At the beginning of 2000, he was appointed as the Executive Director of the Helsinki-based Thomas Community. In 2003, he became a priest in the Cathedral parish and in 2010 became a chaplain in that parish. He served as chaplain at the Helsinki Old Church from 2010 to 2014. He took his office as vicar of Pitäjänmäki on 1 January 2015.

Antturi has been involved in various media work and public duties. In 1987, Antturi co-founded the gospel band Exit and played bass in the band from 1987 to 1991. He was a deputy councillor in Helsinki City Council for the Centre Party in 1997. He has served as the editor of the Thomas Community from 2000 to 2003, as well as a columnist for other magazines, including that for Radio Dei. He has broadcast devotions on Yle Radio 1. In 2009, Antturi ran a fundraising campaign at the Narinkka Square in Helsinki called “The Priest and The Idiot”, in which he read Dostoevsky's work The Idiot  for 10 euros a page. This was to raise funds for World Vision’s work with poor families in Kenya.

References

External links
Arto Antturi TV interview IRR-TV
Arto Antturi blog
 Arto Antturi for Pitäjänmäki Vicar

21st-century Finnish Lutheran clergy
Living people
1961 births
University of Helsinki alumni
Vanderbilt University alumni